Mizar is a bright star in the constellation Ursa Major.

Mizar may also refer to:
 The Mizar system, for writing mathematical definitions and proofs
 AVE Mizar, a flying car
 , two ships in the United States Navy
 Mizar (band), from North Macedonia
 Mizar (album), their 1988 debut album
 Mizar (Sabotaggio in mare), a 1954 Italian war film
 Mizar (mountain), mentioned in Psalm 42 of the Bible
 Mizar, the antagonist in the Jet Force Gemini video game
 Mizar, a character in the book The Sandman: Endless Nights